T-cell immunoglobulin and mucin domain containing 4 (TIMD-4) also known as T-cell membrane protein 4 (TIM-4) is a protein in humans that is encoded by the TIMD4 gene. TIM-4 genes are in mouse present on chromosome 11B1.1 and in humans on chromosome 5q33.2. TIM-4 contains IgV domain with integrin-binding site as well as a unique metal-ion-dependent ligand binding site for phosphatidylserine. TIM-4 also contains mucin domain with high levels of O-glycosylation. In comparison to other TIM proteins (such as TIM-1, TIM-2...) it does not contain a tyrosine-phosphorylation motif in its intracellular tail domain.

TIM-4 expression and function 
Unlike other TIMs that are mainly expressed on T cells TIM-4 is expressed on APCs such as dendritic cells or macrophages. TIM-4 serves as a ligand for TIM-1 but also as a receptor for phosphatidylserine. Its phosphatidylserine binding however does not mediate signalling instead it works more as a tethering receptor. Its phosphatidylserine binding properties also play an important role in removal of apoptotic cells. Moreover recognition of phosphatidylserine also helps to control adaptive immune system by clearing phosphatidylserine expressing apoptotic T cells. That leads to the regulation of antigen specific memory T cells.   TIM-4 is also able to inhibit naive T cells by non-TIM-1 receptor binding but once T cells are active TIM-4 works as positive regulator helping to maintain their activity. TIM-4 expression on macrophages plays an important role in their homeostatic maintenance.

Role in diseases and possible clinical use 
It was shown that TIM-4 plays a role in Th2 development. As such it plays a role in the development of allergies and might be a target for future therapies. TIM-4 was also recognized as a factor in tumor development. For example it was shown that TIM-4 promotes colorectal cancer by activating angiogenesis and recruiting tumor associated macrophages. TIM-4 also mediates autophagy at the site of tumor, which leads to reduced antigen presentation leading to increased toleration of tumor by the immune system. Therefore there are studies using the blockade of TIM-4 as a complementary therapy for cancer treatment.

References